The 1993 All-Ireland Senior Hurling Championship Final was the 106th All-Ireland Final and the culmination of the 1993 All-Ireland Senior Hurling Championship, an inter-county hurling tournament for the top teams in Ireland. The match was held at Croke Park, Dublin, on 5 September 1993, between Kilkenny and Galway. Galway lost to Kilkenny on a score line of 2-17 to 1-15.

All-Ireland Senior Hurling Championship Final
All-Ireland Senior Hurling Championship Final, 1993
All-Ireland Senior Hurling Championship Final
All-Ireland Senior Hurling Championship Finals
Galway GAA matches
Kilkenny GAA matches